Bioč (Serbian Cyrillic: Биоч) is a mountain within the Piva Regional Park in Montenegro, and in part within the Sutjeska National Park in Bosnia and Herzegovina. The mountain is bounded by the rivers Sutjeska in Bosnia, and Vrbnica and Piva in Montenegro.

References

Mountains of Bosnia and Herzegovina
Mountains of Montenegro
International mountains of Europe
Two-thousanders of Bosnia and Herzegovina